Mohamed Al Moukdad is a Lebanese boxer. He competed in the men's welterweight event at the 1980 Summer Olympics.

References

Year of birth missing (living people)
Living people
Lebanese male boxers
Olympic boxers of Lebanon
Boxers at the 1980 Summer Olympics
Place of birth missing (living people)
Welterweight boxers